The International Vocal Competition 's-Hertogenbosch (IVC) is a music competition for classical singing founded in 1954. It is the only classical vocal competition in the Netherlands that also focuses, besides opera, oratorio and Lied.

This biennial event is organised by the Stichting Muziekstad 's-Hertogenbosch. The IVC is a member of the World Federation of International Music Competitions since 1959. The IVC offers singers the chance to perform for casting directors, concert managements, impresarios, the media and a concert and theatregoing audience.

Alongside its competition the IVC also presents master classes, workshops, summer schools and concerts. Concerts are organised in collaboration with various organisations. The IVC also provides advice on repertoire, career possibilities, media management and auditioning.

The IVC has helped launch the careers of many internationally renowned singers (see List of notable IVC alumni). Annett Andriesen, herself an opera singer and a prizewinner of the IVC in 1975, was head of the IVC from 2008 until 2018. She has since been replaced by Ivan van Kalmthout.

The IVC is open to singers of all nationalities who have had conservatory training or have reached an equivalent level. The competition has two categories: Opera/oratorio and Lied Duo. For Preliminary Rounds, Rules & Regulations see the IVC website.

List of notable IVC alumni 

 Elly Ameling 
 Jules Bastin
 Measha Brueggergosman
 Ileana Cotrubaș
 Viorica Cortez
 Veronica Amarres
 Peter Gijsbertsen
 Robert Holl
 Thomas Hampson
 Howard Haskin
 Nadine Koutcher
 Petra Lang
 Yvonne Minton
 Nelly Miricioiu
 Jard van Nes
 Yevgeny Nesterenko
 Vladimir Pankratov
 Lenneke Ruiten
 Wolfgang Schöne
 Elżbieta Szmytka
 Thomas Thomaschke 
 Stefania Toczyska
 Pretty Yende
 Ruth Ziesak

54th International Vocal Competition 's-Hertogenbosch 2021 - LiedDuo

The 54th Competition will be held from 16 – 21 November 2021 at various locations in 's-Hertogenbosch, Netherlands.

Mezzo-soprano Dame Sarah Connolly, award winner of IVC, will be Jury President of the 54th International Vocal Competition 's-Hertogenbosch (IVC), category LiedDuo. 

The IVC offers young and talented singer-pianist duos the chance to perform for an international jury, casting directors, concert managements, impresarios, the media and public. The total prize money of the competition amounts to € 20,000. The IVC is open to singers and pianists of all nationalities. Candidates for this year’s competition can apply for several live First Round auditions or submit their application via YouTube.

Besides Jury President Dame Sarah Connolly, the International Jury includes Christoph Prégardien, tenor Howard Haskins, pianist Charles Spencer, pianist Roger Vignoles and Concertgebouw Amsterdam programmer Mirjam Wijzenbeek (Royal Concertgebouw Amsterdam).

For the first round, the candidates send in a YouTube video. The video jury panel consists of Roberta Alexander (soprano), Jard van Nes (mezzo-soprano), Henk Neven (baritone), Hans Eijsackers (pianist) and Reinild Mees (pianist). IVC director Ivan van Kalmthout is the jury chairman.

External links
Official site

Singing competitions
Opera competitions
Dutch music awards
Music festivals in the Netherlands
1954 establishments in the Netherlands
Annual events in the Netherlands
Music in North Brabant
's-Hertogenbosch
Biennial events